Aaron Martin Donnelly (born 8 June 2003) is a Northern Irish professional footballer who plays for  club Port Vale, on loan from  club Nottingham Forest.

Club career

Nottingham Forest
In June 2019, Donnelly signed a deal with English side Nottingham Forest from Dungannon Swifts, who he had played for since he was twelve. In August 2021, Donnelly signed his first professional contract with Forest. That deal was extended at the end of the 2021–22 season when Forest gained promotion to the Premier League. He made his professional debut for Forest on 23 August 2022, when manager Steve Cooper started him in a 3–0 EFL Cup win over Grimsby Town. In December 2022, Donnelly had extended his contract with Forest.

On 23 January 2023, Donnelly joined EFL League One side Port Vale on loan for the remainder of the 2022–23 season. Manager Darrell Clarke said that Donnelly would provide competition on the left-side of defence following the departure of Connor Hall earlier in the month and noted that assistant manager Andy Crosby had coached the player with the Northern Ireland under-21s. Donnelly made his debut in the English Football League on 28 January, playing on the left-side of a back three alongside Nathan Smith and Lewis Cass as the Vale kept a clean sheet in a 0–0 draw at Cheltenham Town. On 4 March, he scored his first career goal to secure a 1–0 win over Milton Keynes Dons at Vale Park, and dedicated the goal to a deceased supporter whose memory was being honoured with a minute's applause as Donnelly's volley hit the back of the net.

International career
Donnelly has competed with the Northern Ireland national team at under-17 and under-21 level.

Style of play
Donnelly is a left-sided defender who is aggressive in both defence and attack, providing crosses going forward, along with overlaps and underlaps.

Career statistics

References

2003 births
Living people
People from Magherafelt
Association football defenders
Association footballers from Northern Ireland
Northern Ireland under-21 international footballers
Dungannon Swifts F.C. players
Nottingham Forest F.C. players
Port Vale F.C. players
English Football League players